The Department of Employment and Labour is the department of the South African government responsible for matters related to employment, including industrial relations, job creation, unemployment insurance and occupational health and safety.

 the Minister of Employment and Labour is Thembelani Thulas Nxesi. In the 2011/12 budget the department had a budget of R1,981 million and a staff complement of 3,490 civil servants.

References

External links
 Official website

Labour in South Africa
Labour
South Africa
Labour relations in South Africa